Vijay Siddramappa Deshmukh is a member of the 14th Maharashtra Legislative Assembly. He represents the Solapur North Assembly constituency. He is from Lingayat Community. He belongs to the Bharatiya Janata Party. He was appointed Maharashtra's minister of state in December, 2014, he was given responsibility of Public Works (Public Undertakings), Transport Labour, Textiles. He was also given responsibility of being guardian minister of Solapur district.

References

Maharashtra MLAs 2014–2019
Living people
Bharatiya Janata Party politicians from Maharashtra
People from Solapur
Maharashtra politicians
1956 births